Senkashor is a rural locality (a village) in Oshibskoye Rural Settlement, Kudymkarsky District, Perm Krai, Russia. The population was 5 as of 2010.

Geography 
Senkashor is located 24 km north of Kudymkar (the district's administrative centre) by road. Osipova is the nearest rural locality.

References 

Rural localities in Kudymkarsky District